The following highways are numbered 503:

Canada
 Alberta Highway 503
 Manitoba Provincial Road 503
 Newfoundland and Labrador Route 503
Ontario Highway 503 (former)

Costa Rica
 National Route 503

India
 National Highway 503 (India)

Japan
 Japan National Route 503

United States
  County Road 503 (Brevard County, Florida)
  Maryland Route 503 (former)
  County Route 503 (New Jersey)
  Ohio State Route 503
  Washington State Route 503
Territories
  Puerto Rico Highway 503